Brian Woodall (born 6 June 1948, Chester; died 4 May 2007, Chester) was a professional footballer who played in The Football League for four clubs.

Playing career
Woodall began his career by playing for top-flight side Sheffield Wednesday, who he made his league debut for during the 1967–68 season. One of the highlights of his spell at Hillsborough was scoring twice in a 3–1 FA Cup replay win away at Leeds United.

Woodall made just one league appearance for Wednesday during the 1969–70 season and he spent time on loan with Oldham Athletic. At the end of the season he joined hometown club Chester. He made a bright start to his Chester career, scoring on the opening day of the 1970–71 season in a 2–1 win at Brentford. He lost his place in early October 1970 and made just five more first-team appearances after this. He ended the season on loan with Cheshire neighbours Crewe Alexandra.

That marked the end of Woodall's professional career as he joined non-League side Oswestry Town in the summer of 1971.

References

External links
Chester City obituary

1948 births
2007 deaths
Sportspeople from Chester
English footballers
English Football League players
Association football wingers
Sheffield Wednesday F.C. players
Oldham Athletic A.F.C. players
Chester City F.C. players
Crewe Alexandra F.C. players
Oswestry Town F.C. players
Colwyn Bay F.C. players